Father Makes Good is a 1950 American comedy film directed by Jean Yarbrough and written by D.D. Beauchamp. The film stars Raymond Walburn, Walter Catlett, Gary Gray, Mary Stuart, Barbara Brown and Olin Howland. The film was released on May 7, 1950, by Monogram Pictures.

Plot

Cast           
Raymond Walburn as Henry Latham
Walter Catlett as Mayor Colton
Gary Gray as David Latham
Mary Stuart as Barbara Latham
Barbara Brown as Mrs. Latham
Olin Howland as Milo Williams
Jack Kirkwood as Homer Smedley
Brett King as Steve Emory
Georgie Nokes as Georgie Colton 
Robert Emmett Keane as Seton
Mary Field as Mrs. Sweeney
G. Pat Collins as Mr. Joe Sweeney 
Paul E. Burns as Watchman
Francis Ford as Fisherman

References

External links
 

1950 films
American comedy films
1950 comedy films
Monogram Pictures films
Films directed by Jean Yarbrough
American black-and-white films
1950s English-language films
1950s American films